Ascanio in Alba, K. 111, is a pastoral opera in two parts by Wolfgang Amadeus Mozart to an Italian libretto by Giuseppe Parini. It was commissioned by the Empress Maria Theresa for the wedding of her son, Archduke Ferdinand Karl, to Maria Beatrice d'Este on 15 October 1771.

Performance history 
It was first performed at the Teatro Regio Ducale in Milan on 17 October 1771.
It was performed in October 2006 on the 250th anniversary of Mozart's birth at La Scala, Milan, under the baton of Giovanni Antonini. The ballet which linked the two acts was twice performed by the orchestra of the Handel and Haydn Society in Boston in 2006.

Roles

Synopsis 
Place: the site of the future city of Alba Longa, near Rome
Time: mythical times.

Part 1 
The opening scene introduces Venus and Ascanio, the son she had by Aeneas. (In most classical sources, Venus/Aphrodite is the mother of Aeneas.) The goddess vaunts the charms of Alba and invites her son to go and rule there. She urges him not to reveal his identity to Silvia, a nymph to whom he is betrothed, but to introduce himself to her under a false identity to test her virtue. While shepherds summon their promised ruler, Fauno reveals that the smiling face of Aceste, a priest, is a sign that the day will be a day of supreme happiness. Obeying the goddess, Ascanio pretends to be a foreigner attracted by the beauties of the place. Aceste tells the shepherds that their valley will be the site of a fine city and that they will have a sovereign, Ascanio, before the day is out. He also informs Silvia that she will be Ascanio's bride, but she replies that she is in love with a young man she has seen in a dream. The priest reassures her, saying the young man in her dream can be none other than Ascanio. Venus then appears to Ascanio and asks him to test the girl a little longer before revealing his true identity.

Part 2 
Ascanio spots Silvia among the shepherds and tries to talk to her. The girl immediately recognizes the young man from her dreams. Fauno intervenes and suggests to “the foreigner” (Ascanio) that he should go off and announce the building
of Alba in foreign parts. Thus convinced that the foreigner is not Ascanio, Silvia is deeply saddened. She finally decides to accept her fate but declares she never will love anyone else than Ascanio.

Aceste consoles Silvia, saying that her tribulations are about to come to an end. Venus is invoked by a magnificent chorus. Silvia and Ascanio add their voices to the chorus and the goddess descends on her chariot surrounded by clouds. Venus unites the two lovers and explains how she had intended her son to discover the virtue of his fiancée. Aceste pronounces an oath of fidelity and loyalty to Venus, who then retires. It only remains for Ascanio to perpetuate the race of Aeneas and guide the city of Alba to prosperity.

List of numbers 

Overture
No.1 Ballet: Andante grazioso
No.2 Coro di geni e grazie: Di te più amabile, ne Dea maggiore
Recitativo Venere: geni, grazie, ed Amori, fermate il piè
No.3 Aria Venere: L'ombra de' rami tuoi
Recitativo Ascanio & Venere: Ma la ninfa gentil
No.4 Coro di geni e grazie: Di te più amabile, nè Dea maggiore
Rectativo accompagnato Ascanio: Perchè tacer degg'io?
No.5 Aria Ascanio: Cara, lontano ancora
No.6 Coro di pastori: Venga, de' sommi Eroi
Recitativo Ascanio & Fauno: Ma qual canto risona?
No.7 Coro di pastori: Venga, de' sommi Eroi
Recitativo Fauno & Ascanio: Ma tu, chi sei, che ignoto qui t'aggiri fra noi?
No.8 Aria Fauno: Se il labbro più non dice
Recitativo Ascanio & Fauno: Quanto soavi al core de la tua stirpe
No.9 Coro di pastori e pastorelle: Hai di Diana il core
Recitativo Aceste: Oh, generosa Diva
No.10 Coro di pastori: Venga, de' sommi Eroi
Recitativo Aceste: Di propria man la Dea a voi la donera
No.11 Coro di pastori: Venga, de' sommi Eroi
Recitativo Aceste: Oh mia gloria, oh mia cura
No.12 Aria Aceste: Per la gioia in questo seno
Recitativo Silvia & Aceste: Misera! Che farò
No.13 Cavatina Silvia: Si, si, ma d'un altro amore
Recitativo Aceste & Silvia: Ah no, Silvia t'inganni
No.14 Aria Silvia: Come è felice stato
Recitativo Aceste: Silvia, mira, che il sole omai s'avanza
No.15 Coro di pastori: Venga, de' sommi Eroi
Recitativo Ascanio & Venere: Cielo! Che vidi mai?
No.16 Aria Ascani: Ah di sì nobil alma
Recitativo Venere & Ascanio: Un'altra prova a te mirar conviene
No.17 Aria Venere: Al chiaror di que' bei rai
No.18 Coro di geni e grazie: Di te più amabile, nè Dea maggiore
Recitativo Silvia: Star lontana non so
No.19 Aria Silvia: Spiega il desio
No.20 Coro di pastorelle: Già l'ore sen volano
Recitativo Ascanio: Cerco di loco in loco
Recitativo Silvia & Ascanio: Oh ciel! che miro?
Recitativo Silvia, Ascanio & Fauno: Silvia, ove sei?
No.21 Aria Fauno: Dal tuo gentil sembiante
Recitativo Ascanio & Silvia: Ahimè! Che veggio mai?
No.22 Aria Ascanio: Al mio ben mi veggio avanti
Recitativo accompagnato Silvia: Ferma, aspetta, ove vai?
No.23 Aria Silvia: Infelici affetti miei
Recitativo Ascanio & Silvia: Anima grande
No.24 Coro di pastorelle: Che strano evento
Recitativo Ascanio: Ahi la crudel
No.25 Aria Ascanio: Torna mio bene, ascolta
No.26 Coro di pastori: Venga, de' sommi Eroi
Recitativo Aceste: Che strana meraviglia
No.27 Aria Aceste : Sento, che il cor mi dice
Recitativo Silvia: Si, Padre, alfin mi taccia
No.28 Coro di pastori e ninfe e pastorelle: Scendi, celeste Venere
Recitativo Silvia, Aceste & Ascanio: Ma s'allontani almen
No.29 Coro di pastori e pastorelle: No, non possiamo vivere
Recitativo Aceste: Ecco ingombran l'altare
No.30 Coro: Scendi, celeste Venere
Recitativo Aceste, Silvia, Ascanio, Venere: Invoca, o figlia
No.31 Terzetto Silvia, Ascanio, Aceste: Ah caro sposo, oh Dio!
Recitativo Venere: Eccovi al fin di vostre pene
No.32 Piccola parte del terzetto precedente Silvia, Ascanio, Aceste: Che bel piacer io sento
Recitativo Silvia, Ascanio, Aceste, Venere: Ah chi nodi più forti
No.33 Coro ultimo di geni, grazie, pastori e ninfe: Alma Dea, tutto il mondo governa

Recordings
 1976: Mozarteum, Salzburg; Lilian Sukis (Venere), Agnes Baltsa (Ascanio), Edith Mathis (Silvia), Peter Schreier (Aceste), Arleen Augér (Fauno) – Salzburger Kammerchor, Rupert Huber, Mozarteum-Orchester Salzburg, Leopold Hager (CD, 1991)

References
Notes

Citations

External links 
 
 
Work details, libretto, opera-guide.ch (in German/Italian)
Analysis, synopsis, Naxos Records
Libretto
Historical background and review by Jan-Willem Besuijen, Mozart Forum
Discussion of the article above, Mozart Forum

Operas by Wolfgang Amadeus Mozart
Italian-language operas
Pastoral operas
1771 operas
Operas
Operas based on classical mythology